Brief Encounters is a 1967 Soviet romantic drama directed by Kira Muratova.

A woman and her maid are unknowingly both in love with the same man, played by singer and actor Vladimir Vysotsky. The film was released on July 13, 1967 to 4.4 million viewers with a circulation of 425 film copies. In 1987, the film was re-released and attracted 4 million viewers.</ref>

Plot 
After leaving their native village, Nadia and her friend travel to the big city. Along the way, Nadia gets a job in a teashop and meets Maxim, a charming and educated young geologist of whom she becomes enamored. However, Maxim already has a woman he loves, local district committee leader Valya. When Nadia leaves the tea shop and ends up in Valya's town, the latter hires her as a maid and puts her up at her house, while Valya is not aware that they have Maxim in common.

Cast
Nina Ruslanova – Nadia
Vladimir Vysotsky – Maxim
Kira Muratova – Valentina
Lydia Bazilskaya – Lyubka
Olga Viklandt – hairdresser
Alexey Glazyrin – Semyon Semenovich, geologist
Valery Isakov – Styopa, barman
Svetlana Nemolyaeva – Lelia, manicurist
Lyudmila Ivanova – Lidia Sergeevna, fortune-telling neighbor

Awards
1987: Nika Award —  Nina Ruslanova for Best Actress

References

External links

1967 films
1967 romantic drama films
Soviet romantic drama films
Films directed by Kira Muratova
1960s Russian-language films
Vladimir Vysotsky
1967 in the Soviet Union
Odesa Film Studio films
1967 directorial debut films